Coleophora gracilella is a moth of the family Coleophoridae. It is found on the Canary Islands (Fuerteventura) and in Algeria and Tunisia.

References

gracilella
Moths described in 1952
Moths of Africa